The Afrīdī ( Aprīdai, plur.  Aprīdī) are a Pashtun tribe present in Pakistan, with substantial numbers in Afghanistan. The Afridis are most dominant in Pakistan's Federally Administered Tribal Areas, inhabiting about 100p mi2 (8000 km2) of rough hilly area in the Zarlash eastern Spin Ghar range west of Peshawar, covering most of Khyber Agency, FR Peshawar and FR Kohat. Their territory includes the Khyber Pass and Maidan in Tirah. Afridi migrants are also found in India, mostly in the states of Uttar Pradesh, Bihar and in the Kupwara district of Jammu and Kashmir.

Historically, the Afridi have been known for the strategic location they inhabit in South Asia and their belligerence against foreign forces. Under the leadership of Darya Khan Afridi, they engaged in protracted warfare against the Mughal army in the 1670s. During the First, Second, and Third Anglo-Afghan Wars, Afridis fought against the British on the Afghan side; these skirmishes comprised some of the fiercest fighting of the Anglo-Afghan Wars. Ajab Khan Afridi was a well-known Pashtun independence activist against the British Raj.

The British colonial administration frequently classified the peoples of Colonial Indian with fixed personality or "racial" traits and regarded the Pashtun Afridi tribesmen "martial" under the martial races theory. Different Afridi clans also cooperated with the British in exchange for subsidies, and some even served with the Khyber Rifles, an auxiliary force of the British Indian Army.

Shortly after the Partition of India and creation of Pakistan, Afridi tribesmen were among the ranks of the Pashtun militias that invaded the princely state of Jammu and Kashmir in October 1947, sparking the Indo-Pakistani War of 1947–1948 and the ongoing Kashmir conflict. Today, Afridis make use of their dominant positions along the Durand Line in areas of Pakistan's Khyber Pakhtunkhwa province by controlling transport and various businesses, including trade in armaments, munitions and goods.

Etymology and origins

The Afridis, classically called the Abaörteans, have their original homeland in Tirah, Khyber Agency.

A tribe of ancient Pashtuns
Herodotus mentions a tribe of Aryans as Aparytai (Ἀπαρύται). Scholars Grierson, Stein and Olaf Caroe equate these with modern Afridis on the basis of linguistic and geographic analysis. 

Aurel Stein described Afridis with more lighter/fair features, similar to their Dardic neighbors, in contrast to Afghan Pashtuns living on the other side of the KhyberPass, whom he described as darker/swarthier.

Theory of Afridi descent from Israelites

The Afridis, Yusufzais and other Pashtuns of Afghanistan and Pakistan have also been alleged to be the descendants of the lost Jewish tribes such as the Efraim. However, DNA and other research towards validating such claims has been inconclusive.

Clans
The Afridi Tribe is subclassified into eight sub-tribes listed below.

Kuki Khel
Qambar Khel
Zakha Khel
Kamar Khel
Malikdin Khel
Aka Khel
Sepah
Adam Khel

All Afridi clans have their own areas in the Tirah Valley, and most of them extend down into the Khyber Pass over which they have always exercised the right of toll. The Malikdin Khel live in the centre of the Tirah and hold Bagh, the traditional meeting place of Afridi jirgas or assemblies. The Aka Khel are scattered in the hills south of Jamrud. All of this area is included in the Khyber Agency. The Adam Khel live in the hills between Peshawar and Kohat. Their preserve is the Kohat Pass in which several of the most important Afridi gun factories are located.

Religion
All Afridis follow the Sunni sect of Islam. Their conversion to Islam is attributed to Sultan (Emperor) Mahmud of Ghazni by Ibbetson and Haroon Rashid.

History

Resistance against the Mughals
The Afridis and their allies Khalils were first mentioned in the memoirs of Mughal Emperor Babar as violent tribes in need of subduing. The Afridi tribes controlled the Khyber Pass, which has served as a corridor connecting the Indian subcontinent with Afghanistan and Central Asia. Its strategic value was not lost on the Mughals to whom the Afridis were implacably hostile.

Over the course of Mughal rule, Emperors Akbar and Jahangir both dispatched punitive expeditions to suppress the Afridis, to little success.

The Afridis once destroyed two large Mughal armies of Emperor Aurangzeb: in 1672, in a surprise attack between Peshawar and Kabul, and in the winter of 1673, in an ambush in the mountain passes. The emperor sent his Rajpoot general Rai Tulsidas with reinforcements into the mountains to suffocate the revolt and liberate the mountain.

Allegedly, only five Afridis made it out of the battle alive.

Cuisine

Meat is an important part of their diet, which they often eat in the form of kabab (minced meat fried in oil), lamb shorba, chicken shorba, or goat shorba. The hotels in Peshawar Namak Mandi Bazar represent the traditional food of Afridis, especially lamb karahi.

List of notable Afridis

 Shahid Afridi, Pakistani cricketer and former national captain 
 Mirza Muhammad Afridi, Pakistani politician and senator, Deputy Chairman of the Senate of Pakistan and a member of Pakistan Tehreek-e-Insaf
 Zakir Husain Khan, third President of India, from 13 May 1967 until his death on 3 May 1969
 Javed Afridi, owner of PSL team Peshawar Zalmi and owner of Haier Pakistan
 Khatir Afridi, Pashto poet
 Malik Mehrun Nisa Afridi, twice member of the National Assembly of Pakistan from Pakistan Peoples Party
 Riaz Afridi, former cricketer for the Pakistan Cricket Team
 Shaheen Afridi, Pakistani cricketer
 Yasir Afridi, Pakistani footballer
 Sher Ali Afridi, former policeman from Peshawar who assassinated Lord Mayo, the Viceroy of British India, in 1872 
 Umar Gul, of the Malak Din Khel; Pakistani International cricketer
 Shakeel Afridi, physician
 Ayub Afridi, drug lord
 Ahmad Kamal Faridi (Colonel Fareedi, Colonel Faridi), internationally famous character of Ibn-e-Safi, world renowned mystery writer/novelist of Pakistan. Ibn-e-Safi showed in his two novels (out of 125 novels) of Jasoosi Dunya (The Spy World) novel number 52 and novel number 117 that Colonel Fareedi belongs to Afridi tribe.

 Malik Sher Muhammad Khan Afridi, Chief of Sepah. He along with the Maliks of Khyber Agency visited Kolkatta on train from Peshawar along with Political Agent, Colonel Robert Warburton. He also was a key figure in the relations between the Pathans especially the Afridis and the British Government during the 19th century, also mentioned in the book Eighteen Years in the Khyber.

Malik Muhammad Akbar Afridi Sepah, 1946-1998, former Chieftain of the Bara of Khyber Agency, met Princess Diana and former British Prime Minister John Major during their visits to Peshawar, Pakistan.

References

External links

 Encyclopædia Iranica: AFRĪDĪ

Social groups of Pakistan
Karlani Pashtun tribes
Pashto-language surnames
Pakistani names